Talcher Super Thermal Power Station or NTPC Talcher Kaniha located in  Angul district of the Indian state of Odisha is the first mega power plant of India to have an installed generation capacity of 3000MW. The power plant is one of the coal-based power plants of NTPC. The coal for the power plant is sourced from Lingraj Block & Kaniha coal block of Mahanadi Coalfields Ltd. Source of water for the power plant is from Samal Barrage Reservoir on Brahmani River.

The plant supplies power to Indian states of Odisha, Andhra Pradesh, Karnataka, Telangana as well as Bihar and West Bengal. The East South Interconnection of the Indian power grid starts from NTPC kaniha and ends at Kolar in Karnataka. This being a DC link is one of its kind in India as uptill now there are only 3 installed HVDC system present in India. The Southern grid is weakly interconnected to the National grid of India through the Talcher-Kolar HVDC system in the East.

Capacity

See also

 Talcher Thermal Power Station, another coal-based power plant in close vicinity which was taken over by NTPC from Odisha State Electricity Board in June 1995.

References

 NTPC Talcher Kaniha

Coal-fired power stations in Odisha
Angul district
1995 establishments in Orissa
Energy infrastructure completed in 1995